The following is a list of engagements that took place in 1862 during the American Civil War. During the summer and early spring of the year, Union forces gained several successes over the Confederacy, seizing control of Missouri, northern Arkansas, Kentucky, and western Tennessee, along with several coastal areas. Confederate forces defended the capital of Richmond, Virginia, from Union assaults, and then launched counter–offensives into Kentucky and Maryland, both of which end in Union victories.

History
In the Eastern Theater, the Union Army of the Potomac, commanded by Major General George B. McClellan, was transported to Fort Monroe in April to begin an offensive against Richmond, Virginia. Convinced that he was outnumbered by the Confederate Army of Northern Virginia, commanded by General Joseph E. Johnston, McClellan advanced cautiously, taking nearly a month to capture the Confederate defensive works near Yorktown and an additional month to march westward and arrive just outside Richmond.  Here on May 31, Johnston attacked an isolated portion of the Union army in the Battle of Seven Pines; Johnston's plan failed, due to uncoordinated attacks and to Confederate columns which failed to arrive at their assigned positions, and Johnston was wounded during the battle.  To replace Johnston, Confederate President Jefferson Davis choose General Robert E. Lee, who launched the Seven Days Battles in late June. While the Confederate attacks were often disjointed and several commands failed to arrive at their assigned destinations on time, Lee was still able to drive the Union army back to Harrison's Landing, forcing McClellan to give up his attempt to capture Richmond. Although he had driven the Union army away from the Confederate capital, Lee was disappointed that he had failed to destroy the Union army.

Lee then turned northward to deal with the Union Army of Virginia, commanded by Major General John Pope, planning to defeat Pope's army before it could unite with McClellan's army, which was arriving in northern Virginia from the Peninsula. During the Second Battle of Bull Run, Lee routed Pope's army and then invaded Maryland, hoping to seize supplies from Union territory and also hoping that a major Confederate victory in Northern territory would secure foreign recognition for the Confederacy. However, McClellan attacked Lee through the passes of South Mountain and forced Lee to call off his planned invasion of Pennsylvania, instead concentrating his army behind Antietam Creek. Neither army gained a victory at the Battle of Antietam on September 17, but Lee's retreat back to Virginia gave the Union a strategic victory in the campaign. During October and November, Union President Abraham Lincoln pressured McClellan to launch an aggressive campaign against Lee but McClellan refused, instead moving slowly and demanding supplies. Lincoln replaced McClellan on November 7 with Major General Ambrose Burnside, who hoped to cross the Rappahannock River near Fredericksburg, Virginia in order to get between Lee and Richmond. However, delays in obtaining a pontoon bridge prevented Burnside from crossing the river until December 11, by which time Lee was able to concentrate his entire army along a series of ridges near Fredericksburg. On December 13, Burnside attacked the Confederate positions and lost heavily; two days later he retreated back across the river and went into winter quarters.

In the Western Theater, the Confederate forces, commanded by General Albert S. Johnston, were forced to abandon Kentucky and much of central and western Tennessee following the loss of Fort Donelson and Fort Henry in February. The capture of the two forts turned the Union commander in the battles, Major General Ulysses S. Grant, into a national hero. Johnston, following a plan proposed by his second-in-command General P. G. T. Beauregard, concentrated as many forces as he could near Corinth, Mississippi and attacked Grant's Army of the Tennessee near Shiloh Church. Although successful in driving the Union army almost into the Tennessee River on April 6, Johnston was mortally wounded during the battle, while Grant was reinforced during the night by the Army of the Ohio, commanded by Major General Don Carlos Buell. Grant then led a counterattack the following morning and drove the Confederates from the field, who then retreated back to their base at Corinth. Major General Henry W. Halleck took command of the Union forces operating in western Tennessee and advanced to Corinth, where both armies settled in for a month-long siege. Fearing that a full scale Union assault on the Confederate defenses was imminent, Beauregard evacuated Corinth during the night of May 29–30 without Halleck's forces finding out until the following morning.

Beauregard was relieved of command shortly afterwards, due to his health; Jefferson Davis replaced him with General Braxton Bragg. Following the Union victory at Corinth, Halleck dispersed his army across northern Mississippi, western Tennessee, and northern Alabama to protect the railroads, while sending Buell's Army of the Ohio eastward to capture Chattanogga, but problems with the Union supply lines prevented Buell from capturing the city. Bragg, pondering how to counteract the Union threat, received a message from Lieutenant General Edmund Kirby Smith, commander of the Confederate Department of East Tennessee, suggesting that the two combine forces to defeat Buell and retake Kentucky. Moving his troops by rail starting the end of June, Bragg arrived at Chattanooga near the end of July; from there he advanced into Kentucky towards the Ohio River. Buell moved north as well, managing to reach Louisville before Bragg did; from there he moved south towards Bragg. The two armies met in battle near Perryville, Kentucky on October 8; Bragg's forces attacked Buell's left wing but without success. Bragg retreated that night and united with Smith, intending to remain in Kentucky, but when Buell threatened his line of retreat, Bragg move south for Tennessee.

The Union navy, in concert with the army, captured several more coastal areas along the Atlantic seaboard and Gulf coast. Following the Union victory at Hatteras Inlet the previous year, other parts of the North Carolina coast, including New Berne, were captured; in April, Union forces attacked and captured Fort Pulaski in Georgia following a thirty hour bombardment, cutting off Savannah from blockade runners. This victory left Wilmington, North Carolina as the only major Atlantic port to remain in Confederate hands. Several ports in Florida and along the Gulf coast were captured as well, including Apalachicola and St. Augustine in Florida and Biloxi, Mississippi. In April, a Union squadron commanded by Commodore David Farragut ran past Forts Jackson and St. Philip near the mouth of the Mississippi River and forced the surrender of New Orleans, the largest Confederate port city in both population and in trade volume.

In the Trans-Mississippi Theater, the Confederates launched several offensive campaigns, all of which failed. In late January, Union Major General Samuel R. Curtis maneuvered the Missouri State Guard out of the state and into northwestern Arkansas; due to a shortage of supplies, Curtis had to halt his advance in the area of Pea Ridge. In response to the Union advance, Confederate President Jefferson Davis sent Major General Earl Van Dorn to Arkansas to take command of the Confederate forces in the state. After he arrived in early March, Van Dorn launched an offensive of his own, which resulted in the two-day Battle of Pea Ridge, a Confederate defeat. After the battle, he was ordered to take his army east of the Mississippi River and join the Confederate army at Corinth, Mississippi, but he arrived too late to fight in the Battle of Shiloh.

In Texas, Brigadier General Henry Sibley raised a brigade of cavalry and led it into the New Mexico Territory, intending to drive the remaining Union forces from it and advance into Colorado, capturing the gold and silver mines located in the territory. He fought the main Union force in the territory, commanded by Colonel Edward R.S. Canby, at the Battle of Valverde on February 17; although the battle was a Confederate victory, Sibley failed to force Canby to surrender. Instead, Sibley continued northward, leaving Canby in his rear. Continuing northward along the Rio Grande and the Santa Fe Tail, his brigade met a Union force, which included the 1st Colorado Infantry, at Glorieta Pass on March 28. The Confederates again drove the Union force from the field, but during the battle a Union detachment burned most of the Confederate supply train, along with most of their supplies. This meant that the Confederates had to retreat back to Texas, reaching it by mid-April, losing over 1,500 men out of an original force of 3,700 men.

Engagements

See also

 Mississippi River campaigns in the American Civil War

Notes

References
 Barrett, John G. The Civil War in North Carolina. Chapel Hill, North Carolina: University of North Carolina Press, 1963. .
 Bennett, B. Kevin. "The Battle of Richmond, Kentucky: 'A Victory Brilliant and Complete'", in Blue & Gray, Volume 25, issue 6 (2009), pp. 6–26, 43–50. .
 Burton, Brian K. Extraordinary Circumstances: The Seven Days Battles. Indianapolis, Indiana: Indiana University Press, 2001. .
 Chaitin, Peter M. The Coastal War: Chesapeake Bay to Rio Grande. Alexandria, Virginia: Time–Life Books, 1984. .
 Cheeks, Robert C. "Ewell's Flawless Performance at Kettle Run", in America's Civil War, Volume 13, Number 5 (November 2000), pp. 50–55. .
 Cozzens, Peter. The Darkest Days of the War: The Battles of Iuka & Corinth. Chapel Hill, North Carolina: University of North Carolina Press, 1997. .
 Cozzens, Peter. Shenandoah 1862: Stonewall Jackson's Valley Campaign. Chapel Hill, North Carolina: University of North Carolina Press, 2008. .
 Foote, Shelby. The Civil War: A Narrative. Volume I: Fort Sumter to Perryville. New York: Vintage Books, 1958. .
 Frazier, Donald S. Blood & Treasure: Confederate Empire in the Southwest. College Station, Texas: Texas A&M University Press, 1995. .
 Hennessy, John J. Return to Bull Run: The Campaign and Battle of Second Manassas. New York: Simon & Schuster, 1993. .
 Josephy, Jr., Alvin M. The Civil War in the American West. New York: Alfred A. Knopf, 1991. .
 Kennedy, Frances H. (editor) The Civil War Battlefield Guide, 2nd edition. New York: Houghton Mifflin, 1998. .
 Long, E. B. The Civil War Day by Day: An Almanac, 1861–1865. Garden City, NY: Doubleday, 1971. .
 Long, E. B. "Plum Run Bend: The Forgotten Battle", in Civil War Times Illustrated, Vol. XI, no. 3 (June 1972), pp. 4–11, 40–45. .
 Longacre, Edward G. Lee's Cavalrymen: A History of the Mounted Forces of the Army of Northern Virginia. Mechanisburg, Pennsylvania: Stackpole Books, 2002. .
 Naisawald, L. VanLoan. "Stonewall's Manassas Return", in America's Civil War, Volume 15, Number 5 (November 2002), pp. 62–69. .
 Sears, Stephen W. To the Gates of Richmond: The Peninsula Campaign. New York: Ticknor and Fields, 1992. .
 Shea, William L. Fields of Blood: The Prairie Grove Campaign. Chapel Hill, North Carolina: University of North Carolina Press, 2009. .
 Shea, William L., & Earl J. Hess. Pea Ridge: Civil War Campaign in the West. Chapel Hill, North Carolina: University of North Carolina Press, 1992. .
 Sheppard, Jonathan C. By the Noble and Daring of Her Sons: The Florida Brigade of the Army of Tennessee. Tuscaloosa, Alabama: University of Alabama Press, 2012. .
 Symonds, Craig L. A Battlefield Atlas of the Civil War. Annapolis, Maryland: The Nautical and Aviation Publishing Company of America, 1983. .
 Wegner, Dana. "Commodore William D. Porter", in Civil War Times Illustrated, Vol. XI, no. 4 (July 1972), pp. 26–25. .
 Wills, Brian Steel. A Battle from the Start: The Life of Nathan Bedford Forrest. New York: Harper Collins, 1992. .

1862 in the United States
American Civil War timelines
Battles of the American Civil War
Battles 1862